Thestor dryburghi, the Dryburgh's skolly, is a species of butterfly in the family Lycaenidae. It is endemic to South Africa where it is only known from northern Namaqualand in succulent Karoo-covered hills at Kamieskroon to the north-west of Steinkopf in the North Cape.

The wingspan is 34–37 mm for males and 36–38 mm for females. Adults are on wing from August to October. There is one generation per year.

References

Thestor
Butterflies described in 1966
Endemic butterflies of South Africa
Taxonomy articles created by Polbot